The 2012 Bulgarian Supercup was the tenth Bulgarian Supercup match, a football match which was contested between the "A" professional football group champion, Ludogorets, and the runner-up of the Bulgarian Cup, Lokomotiv Plovdiv. As the Bulgarian Cup winner for 2012 was also the team of Ludogorets, Lokomotiv Plovdiv therefore played in the Supercup match as the finalist. The match was played on 11 July 2012 at the Lazur Stadium in Burgas, Bulgaria.

This was the first ever Supercup final for Ludogorets in their history. While for Lokomotiv Plovdiv this was their second participation after 2004 when they won the Cup after a 1:0 win against Litex Lovech.

Ludogorets secured their 1st Bulgarian Supercup in history. Júnior Caiçara gave the lead before Dakson equalised from a freekick for Lokomotiv Plovdiv. Goals from Emil Gargorov and Marcelinho in the last minute clinched the first Supercup for the Razgrad side and also achieving their 1st ever treble in one season after winning the title and the national cup the same year.

Match details

References

2012
Supercup
PFC Ludogorets Razgrad matches
PFC Lokomotiv Plovdiv matches